Pablo Bustinduy Amador (born 1983) is a Spanish politician, member of Podemos. He has been member of the 11th and 12th Congress of Deputies, representing Madrid.

Biography 
Born in Madrid on 19 March 1983, he is son of Ángeles Amador, minister of Health during the Felipe González Government, and Javier Bustinduy, former director of RENFE and Metro de Madrid. He graduated in Political and Administration Sciences at the Complutense University of Madrid. He is a PhD candidate in Philosophy at the New School for Social Research. After 8 years living in New York, where he taught Philosophy at St. Francis College, Fairfield University and the State University of New York between 2010 and 2013, he returned to Spain in order to help in the Podemos campaign for the 2014 European Parliament election. He became responsible for the International Relations of the party.

He ran as candidate in the Podemos list in Madrid for the 2015 general election, and was elected member of the Congress of Deputies. He was re-elected in the 2016 general election. He has served as spokesman of his parliamentary group in the Commission of Foreign Affairs of the Congress of Deputies.
In November 2018, Bustinduy won the primaries to lead his party list in the 2019 European Parliament election, pending later mergings with other parties notwithstanding.

In March 2019 Bustinduy renounced to heading the list of Unidas Podemos vis-à-vis the 2019 European Parliament election. Bustinduy and Podemos announced María Eugenia Rodríguez Palop—described as a "political and moral mainstay" by Bustinduy—would assume his place.

Political positions 
A convinced europeanist, Bustinduy supports both the European Union and the euro. He is opposed to the TTIP. He sided with Íñigo Errejón in the context of the candidacy of the later during the 2017 Podemos primaries in the 2nd Congress of the party.

References 

1983 births
Living people
Members of the 11th Congress of Deputies (Spain)
Members of the 12th Congress of Deputies (Spain)
Podemos (Spanish political party) politicians